Knut Thomassen (17 March 1921 – 20 January 2002) was a Norwegian actor and theatre director. He made his stage debut at Det Nye Teater in Oslo in 1941. He served as theatre director of Den Nationale Scene from 1967 to 1976. He was an active participant in organizational work, and chaired National and Scandinavian theatre associations for many years. He was decorated Knight, First Class of the Royal Norwegian Order of St. Olav in 1976, and received the Hedda Honorary Award in 1990.

References

1921 births
2002 deaths
Norwegian male stage actors
Norwegian male film actors
Norwegian male television actors
Norwegian theatre directors
20th-century Norwegian male actors
Actors from Stavanger